Alejandra Fosalba Henry (born 4 July 1969) is an actress from Chile, born in Concepción. Right after school, she discovered her calling, theater, and went to Santiago to study.

She has said that her television career was started slowly.  Some of her work include Iorana, Loca Piel, and Los Treinta, where she played Diana, wife of the character played by Francisco Melo, who had an improper relationship with one of her friends.  In this soap opera she made one of her first adult (naked) scenes.

Filmography

Film

Television

Other parts
 Video Musical - "Caliente" - Los pericos - (1996)

External links
 

1969 births
Chilean film actresses
Chilean telenovela actresses
Chilean television actresses
Living people
People from Concepción, Chile